Jake Jones may refer to:

Jake Jones (baseball) (1920–2000), American baseball player
Jake Jones (basketball) (born 1949), American basketball player
Jake Jones (footballer) (born 1993), English footballer

See also
Jacob Jones (disambiguation)